The Mundaka Upanishad is an ancient Sanskrit Vedic text, embedded inside Atharva Veda. It is a Mukhya (primary) Upanishad, and is listed as number 5 in the Muktika canon of 108 Upanishads of Hinduism. It is among the most widely translated Upanishads.

It is presented as a dialogue between great sacrificer Saunaka and sage Angiras. It is a poetic verse style Upanishad, with 64 verses, written in the form of mantras. However, these mantras are not used in rituals, rather they are used for teaching and meditation on spiritual knowledge.

The Mundaka Upanishad contains three Mundakams (parts), each with two sections. The first Mundakam, states Roer, defines the science of "Higher Knowledge" and "Lower Knowledge", and then asserts that acts of oblations and pious gifts are foolish, and do nothing to reduce unhappiness in current life or next, rather it is knowledge that frees. The second Mundakam describes the nature of the Brahman, the Self, the relation between the empirical world and the Brahman, and the path to know Brahman. The third Mundakam expands the ideas in the second Mundakam and then asserts that the state of knowing Brahman is one of freedom, fearlessness, complete liberation, self-sufficiency and bliss.

Some scholars suggest that passages in the Mundaka Upanishad present the pantheism theory.

In some historic Indian literature and commentaries, the Mundaka Upanishad is included in the canon of several verse-structured Upanishads that are together called as Mantra Upanishad and Mantropanishad.

Etymology
Mundaka (Sanskrit: मुण्डक) literally means "shaved (as in shaved head), shorn, lopped trunk of a tree". Eduard Roer suggests that this root is unclear, and the word as title of the Upanishad possibly refers to "knowledge that shaves, or liberates, one of errors and ignorance". The chapters of the Mundaka Upanishad are also sequentially referred to as "Mundakam" in ancient and medieval texts, for unclear etymological reasons.

Chronology
The exact chronology of Mundaka Upanishad, like other Vedic texts, is unclear. All opinions rest on scanty evidence, an analysis of archaism, style and repetitions across texts, driven by assumptions about likely evolution of ideas, and on presumptions about which philosophy might have influenced which other Indian philosophies.

Phillips dates Mundaka Upanishad as a relatively later age ancient Upanishad, well after Brihadaranyaka, Chandogya, Isha, Taittiriya, Aitareya, Kena and Katha. Paul Deussen considers Mundaka Upanishad to be composed in a period where poetic expression of ideas became a feature of ancient Indian literary works.

Patrick Olivelle writes: "Both the Mundaka and the Mahanarayana are rather late Upanisads and are, in all probability, post-Buddhist."

Most of the teachings in the Upanishads of Hinduism, including Manduka Upanishad, however, relate to the existence of Self and Brahman, and the paths to know, realize one's Self and Brahman, making the fundamental premise of Mundaka Upanishad distinctly different than Buddhism's denial of "Self or Brahman".

Some of the ideas and allegories in Mundaka Upanishad have chronological roots in more ancient Vedic literature such as Brihadaranyaka, Chandogya and Katha Upanishads. The allegory of "blind leading the blind" in section 1.2 of Mundaka, for example, is also found in Katha Upanishad's chapter 1.2. The allegory of two birds in section 3.1 of Mundaka Upanishad, similarly, is found in hymns of Rig Veda chapter I.164.

Structure
The Mundaka Upanishad has three Mundakams (parts, or shavings), each part has two khanda (खण्ड, section or volume). The section 1.1 has 9 mantras structured as metered poetic verses. Section 1.2 has 13 verses, section 2.1 includes 10 verses, section 2.2 is composed of 11 verses, section 3.1 has 10, while the last section 3.2 has 11 verses. Combined, the Upanishad features 64 mantras.

Several manuscript versions of Mundaka Upanishad have been discovered so far. These show minor differences, particularly in the form additional text being inserted and interpolated, the insertion apparent because these texts do not fit structurally into the metered verses, and also because the same text is missing in manuscripts discovered elsewhere.

Content
The Mundaka Upanishad opens with declaring Brahma as the first of gods, the creator of the universe, and the knowledge of Brahman (Ultimate Reality, Eternal Principle, Cosmic Self) to be the foundation of all knowledge. The text then lists a succession of teachers who shared the knowledge of Brahman with the next generation. Charles Johnston suggests that this announces the Vedic tradition of teacher-student responsibility to transfer knowledge across the generations, in unbroken succession. Johnston further states that the names recited are metaphors, such as the One who Illuminates, Keeper of Truth, Planetary Spirit, mythological messenger between Gods and Men among others, suggesting the divine nature and the responsibility of man to continue the tradition of knowledge sharing across human generations.

The higher knowledge versus lower knowledge - First Mundakam
In verse 1.1.3 of Mundaka Upanishad, a Grihastha (householder) approaches a teacher, and asks,

The setting of this question is significant, states Johnston, because it asserts that knowledge transfer is not limited to old teachers to youthful students, rather even adult householders became pupil and sought knowledge from teachers in Vedic tradition.

The teacher answered, states verse 1.1.4 of the Mundaka Upanishad, by classifying all knowledge into two: "lower knowledge" and "higher knowledge". Hume calls these two forms of knowledge as "traditions of religion" and "knowledge of the eternal" respectively.

The lower knowledge, states the Upanishad, includes knowledge of Vedas, phonetics, grammar, etymology, meter, astronomy and the knowledge of sacrifices and rituals. The higher knowledge is the knowledge of Brahman and Self-knowledge - the one which cannot be seen, nor seized, which has no origin, no Varna, no eyes, nor ears, no hands, nor feet, one that is the eternal, all-pervading, infinitesimal, imperishable, indestructible. Some manuscripts of Manduka Upanishad expand the list of lower knowledge to include logic, history, Puranas and Dharma.

Sacrifices, oblations and pious works are useless, knowledge useful - First Mundakam
The first seven mantras of second khanda of first Mundakam explain how man has been called upon, promised benefits for, scared unto and misled into performing sacrifices, oblations and pious works. In verses 1.2.7 through 1.2.10, the Upanishad asserts this is foolish and frail, by those who encourage it and those who follow it, because it makes no difference to man's current life and after-life, it is like blind men leading the blind, it is a mark of conceit and vain knowledge, ignorant inertia like that of children, a futile useless practice.

The Mundaka Upanishad, in verses 1.2.11 through 1.2.13, asserts knowledge liberates man, and those who undertake Sannyasa (renunciation) to gain such knowledge achieve that knowledge through Tapas (meditation, austerity), living a simple tranquil life on alms, without any sacrifices and rituals. In verse 12 and 13, the Upanishad suggests that "perishable acts cannot lead to eternal knowledge", instead those who seek freedom must respectfully approach a competent, peace-filled, wise Guru (teacher) to gain knowledge.

Brahman is the inner Self of all things - Second Mundakam
Mundaka Upanishad, in the first section of the second Mundakam, defines and expounds on the doctrine of Atman-Brahman. It asserts that just like a blazing fire creates thousand sparks and leaping flames in its own form, beings are brought forth from Brahman in its form. The Brahman is imperishable, without body, it is both without and within, never produced, without mind, without breath, yet from it emerges the inner Self of all things. From Brahman is born breath, mind, sensory organs, space, air, light, water, earth, everything. The section expands this idea as follows,

The section continues on, asserting Brahman as the cause of mountains, rivers of every kind, plants, herbs and all living beings, and it is "the inner Self that dwells in all beings". Brahman is everything, the empirical and the abstract, the object, the subject and the action (karma). To know Brahman, is to be liberated.

This is a form of pantheism theory, that continues into the second section of the second Mundakam of the Upanishad.

Om, Self and Brahman - Second Mundakam
The Mundaka Upanishad, in the second Mundakam, suggests a path to knowing the Self and the Brahman: meditation, self-reflection and introspection. The verses in the second and third Mundakams, also assert that the knowledge of Self and Brahman "cannot" be gained from chanting the Vedas, but only comes from meditation and inner introspection for meaning. Adi Shankara, in his review of the Mundaka Upanishad, calls the meditation as Yoga.

In verse 2.2.2, the Mundaka Upanishad asserts that Atman-Brahman is the real. In verse 2.2.3 offers an aid to the meditation process, namely Om (Aum). The poetic verse is structured as a teacher-pupil conversation, but where the teacher calls the pupil as a friend, as follows,

The Upanishad, in verse 2.2.8 asserts that the man with the knowledge of the Self and who has become one with Brahman, is liberated, is not affected by karman, is free of sorrow and self-doubts, is one who lives in bliss.

Reach the highest Oneness in all beings - Third Mundakam
The third Mundakam begins with the allegory of two birds, as follows,

Mathur states that this metaphor of the birds sitting on the same tree refers to one being the empirical self and the other as the eternal and transcendental self. It is the knowledge of eternal self, Atman-Brahman and its Oneness with all others, that liberates. The Upanishad states in verse 3.1.4 that the Self is the life of all things, and there is delight in this Self (Ātman).

These early verses of the third Mundakam have been variously interpreted. To theist schools of Hinduism, the Isa is God. To non-theist schools of Hinduism, the Isa is Self. The theosophist Charles Johnston explains the theistic view, not only in terms of schools of Hinduism, but as a mirroring the theism found in Christianity and other scriptures around the world. These verses, states Johnston, describe the sorrow that drowns those who are unaware or feel separated from their Lord. The disciple, when firmly understands his individuality, reaches for meaning beyond individuality, discovers Lord, discovers the wonderful complex life of Eternal God, states Johnston, and then he is on the way of "light of lights". Johnston quotes from Isaiah and Revelation, thus: "The Lord shall be unto thee an everlasting light, and thy God thy glory".

Adi Shankara's commentary offers, as an example, an alternative interpretation in Hinduism. Shankara explains the non-dualistic view as follows: "By meditation and different paths of Yoga, man finds the other, not subject to the bondage of Samsara, unaffected by grief, ignorance, decay and death. He thinks thus: I am the atman, alike in all, seated in every living thing and not the other; this universe is mine, the lord of all; then he becomes absolved of all grief, released entirely from the ocean of grief, i.e. his object is accomplished". This is the state, asserts Shankara, free of grief, when man reaches the supreme equality which is identity with the Brahman. The equality in matters involving duality in certainly inferior to this, states Shankara.

Be ethical, know yourself, be tranquil  - Third Mundakam
The last section of the Mundaka Upanishad asserts the ethical precepts necessary for man to attain the knowledge of the Brahman and thus liberation.

Through ethical practices combined with meditation, must a man know his Self. Atman-Brahman is not perceived, states the Upanishad, by the eye, nor by speech, nor by other senses, not by penance, nor by karma of rituals. It is known to those whose nature has become purified by the serene light of knowledge, who meditate on it, who dwell unto it. This is the state, asserts Mundaka Upanishad, when one's thoughts is integrated and interwoven with one's body and all else. When thoughts are pure, the Self arises, states verse 3.1.9. This state of man is the state of Bhuti (भूति, inner power, prosperity and happiness).

In the second section of the third Mundakam, the Upanishad asserts, "the Self cannot be realized by those who lack inner strength, nor by the careless or heedless, nor by devotion or false notions of austerity, nor by knowledge of the empirical. It is obtained by the Self by which it is desired. His Self reveals its own truth". Once such self-knowledge is reached, calmness of mind results, a life of liberation emerges, one becomes and behaves like the Brahman. He is beyond sorrow, he is beyond sin, he is in tranquil union with the Self of all.

Reception
The Mundaka Upanishad has been widely translated, as well as commented upon in Bhasya by ancient and medieval era Indian scholars such as Shankara and Anandagiri. Mundaka has been one of the most popular Upanishads, in past and present. Badarayana devotes three out of twenty eight adhikaranas to Mundaka Upanishad, while Shankara cites it 129 times in his commentary on the Brahmasutra. Deussen states that this popularity is because of the literary accomplishment, purity in expression and the beauty of the verses in expressing the profound thoughts that are otherwise shared by other Upanishads of Hinduism.

Gough calls Mundaka Upanishad as "one of the most important documents in ancient Indian philosophy". It encapsulates the Vedic teachings, states Gough, that "he that meditates upon any deity as a being other than himself has no knowledge, and is mere victim to the gods", and "there is no truth in the many, all truth is in the one; and this one that alone is the Self, the inmost essence of all things, that vivifies all sentiencies and permeates all things. This is the pure bliss, and it dwells within the heart of every creature".

Ross, in his chapters on "meaning of life in Hinduism", frequently cites Mundaka Upanishad, and states it to be an example of ancient efforts in India to refine tools and discipline of realizing liberation or Moksha.

Johnston states that the ancient message in Mundaka Upanishad is relevant to the modern age where "search for and application of Truth" alone often predominates the fields of science. Mundaka Upanishad reminds the central importance of Truth in its third Mundakam, yet it also emphasizes the need for "beauty and goodness", because "truth, beauty and goodness" together, states Johnston, create arts, music, poetry, painting, meaning and spiritual answers.

Jacobs has called Mundaka Upanishad as profound, and counts it as one of the essential philosophical foundations of Hinduism.

Cultural impact

The Mundaka Upanishad is the source of the phrase Satyameva Jayate, which is the national motto of India. It appears in its national emblem with four lions.

See also
 Upanishads
 Vedas
 Brahman
 Atman
 Moksha
 Hinduism

References

External links

 Text and translation
 The Mundaka Upanishad with Shankara’s Commentary Translated by S. Sitarama Sastri, online ebook
Mundaka Upanishad Max Muller (Translator), The Sacred Books of the East, Volume 15, Oxford University Press
Mundaka Upanishad Robert Hume (Translator), Oxford University Press
Mundaka Upanishad in ITRANS
Multiple translations (Raja Ram Mohun Roy, Johnston, Nikhilānanda, Gambhirananda)
Mundaka Upanishad (Sanskrit) in Devanāgarī script
Mundaka Upanishad Sanderson Beck (Translator)
Mundaka Upanishad Another archive of Nikhilānanda translation

 Recitation
 Mundak Upanishad recited by Pt. Ganesh Vidyalankar
 

Upanishads